Pimelea latifolia is a species of flowering plant in the family Thymelaeaceae and is endemic to eastern Australia. It is a shrub with hairy young stems, egg-shaped leaves with the narrower end towards the base, and greenish-yellow to white, tube-shaped flowers.

Description
The flowers are greenish-yellow to white, and are either bisexual or female, with leaf-like bracts at the base. Flowering mostly occurs from August to October.

Taxonomy and naming
Pimelea latifolia was first formally described in 1810 by Robert Brown in Prodromus Florae Novae Hollandiae et Insulae Van Diemen. The specific epithet (latifolia) means "broad-leaved".

The Australian Plant Census accepts Pimelea latifolia subsp. altior as a synonym of P. altior, subsp. hirsuta as a synonym of P. hirsuta  and subsp. elliptifolia as a synonym of Pimelea hirsuta subsp. elliptifolia.

Distribution and habitat
This pimelea occurs from north of Cairns in far north Queensland to near Bowral in New South Wales.

References

latifolia
Flora of New South Wales
Flora of Queensland
Malvales of Australia
Plants described in 1810
Taxa named by Robert Brown (botanist, born 1773)